The following show the typical symbols for consonants and vowels used in SAMPA, an ASCII-based system based on the International Phonetic Alphabet. Note that SAMPA is not a universal system as it varies from language to language.

Consonants

Consonant modifiers

Simplified list of consonants

Vowels

Vowel modifiers

Simplified list of vowels

External links
 SAMPA computer readable phonetic alphabet

See also
 SAMPA chart for English
 X-SAMPA